Ibn Ziad is a town and commune in Constantine Province, Algeria. According to the 1998 census it has a population of 15,514.

References

Communes of Constantine Province
Constantine Province